The Rongmei people, also known as the Rongmei Naga, are a Tibeto-Burmese indigenous ethnic group of Northeast India.

Some historians and anthropologists have earlier recorded them as Kabui along with Inpui. They are recognised as Scheduled Tribes (STs) by the Constitution of India. They celebrate festivals like Karing-ngei, Somdungnu, Tataaknu, and Muliaang.

Eventually, under the leadership of Haipou Jadonang and his successor Rani Gaidinliu, the Rongmei rebelled against British rule in the 1930s. This rebellion gave momentum to and garnered support for the vision of Naga Raj.

Religion

Rongmei Baptist Churches Council 
Rongmei Baptist Churches Council (RBCC), formally known as Rongmei Naga Baptist Association (RNBA) is the parent body of Rongmei churches of Manipur and Assam in North East India. There are more than 200 churches which are affiliated with Rongmei Baptist Churches Council.

Notable people 
 Alana Golmei
 Grace Dangmei
 Gaikhangam Gangmei
 Gangmumei Kamei
 Haipou Jadonang
 Jiangam Kamei
 Meijinlung Kamson
 Rani Gaidinliu
 Rachunliu G. Kamei

See also 
Hill tribes of Northeast India
Nagaland
Tamenglong
Zeliangrong
List of Naga tribes

References

External links
www.nambon.com - Zeliangrong community information

Scheduled Tribes of Manipur
Naga people
Ethnic groups in Northeast India
Ethnic groups in South Asia